Mota del Cuervo is a municipality of Spain located in the province of Cuenca, Castilla–La Mancha. The municipality spans across a total area of 176.19 km2 and, as of 1 January 2020, it has a registered population of 6,055.

It is one of the few locations in Spain where pottery has been a primarily female-dominated activity. Lying at the feet of a hill chain with windmills, other landmarks include the parish church, the former convent of the Trinitaries and the residence of Fray Alonso Cano.

References  

Municipalities in the Province of Cuenca